Ring Around the World is a 1966 Italian-French Eurospy film written and directed by Luigi Scattini (here credited as Arthur Scott) and starring Richard Harrison.

The French director Georges Combret is credited as co-director but he only shot a few scenes of the film.	 Several scenes were originally shot in Hong Kong but due to production issues they were unusable and had to be re-shot in Rome.

Plot

Cast 

 Richard Harrison as Fred Lester 
 Hélène Chanel as  Mary Brightford
 Giacomo Rossi Stuart as The Hitman  
 Dominique Boschero as Yo-Yo
 Bernard Blier as Lord Richard Berry 
 José Lewgoy 
 Silvio Bagolini

References

External links

1960s Italian-language films
Italian spy thriller films
French spy thriller films
Films directed by Luigi Scattini
Films directed by Georges Combret
Films scored by Piero Umiliani
1960s French films
1960s Italian films